Hnoss (Old Norse: , "treasure") is one of the daughters of Freyja and Óðr in Norse mythology.

Name 
The Old Norse term Hnoss has been translated in a variety of ways by scholars and folklorists. The Goddess Myths of the Great Mother  claims that Hnoss' name was drawn from the word "Gem," in which she is described as sparkling like a diamond. Given Hnoss is the daughter of the most beautiful goddess Freya, it should come as no surprise that jewels bear her name.

The Roles of the Northern Goddess similarly claims that Hnoss' name derives from a great beauty whose name may be "used for treasure in poetry" or simply "treasure." This translation shares semantic and etymological similarities with the Icelandic word hnoss (meaning "nipper") as well as the Old Danish words noss (meaning "sweetheart") and nusse (meaning "infant"). In the Prose Edda, Snorri Sturluson states that beautiful things were called hnossir (Old Norse: 'treasures') after her name.

Despite of all various interpretations, The Concept of The Goddess, states that Hnoss "bears her mother's eyelash-rain," which translates to "there is gold on the precious object."

Attestations 
In Gylfaginning (The Beguiling of Gylfi), Hnoss is portrayed as the beautiful daughter of Freyja and Óð:

In Skáldskaparmál (The Language of Poetry), a þulur (18–22) mentions Hnoss as the daughter of Freyja ("How shall Freyia be referred to? By calling her (...) mother of Hnoss"), and in Ynglinga saga a passage (Chapter Ten) describes "Hnoss and Gersimi" as her daughters. Gersemi (whose name also means 'treasure' and only appears in this passage of the Prose Edda) could be the same figure as Hnoss.

The 12th-century skald Einarr Skúlason, cited by Snorri in Skáldskaparmál, refers to Hnoss in a kenning as Freyia's "glorious child" and Freyr’s niece:

References

Bibliography

Vanir
Norse goddesses
Freyja